The Wisconsin Film Festival is an annual film festival, founded in 1999. The festival is held every April in Madison, Wisconsin, and has recently been expanded from five days to eights days.

The Festival presents a broad range of independent American and world cinema (narrative, documentary, experimental, shorts), restorations and revivals, and locally made pictures from Wisconsin filmmakers. Presented by the University of Wisconsin–Madison's Arts Institute, this is the largest campus-based film festival in the United States.

The festival plays in nine theaters, all within walking distance, in the heart of the state's capital city. The 2010 festival, which opened with the New Zealand documentary The Topp Twins: Untouchable Girls, screened 192 films and had an attendance of 34,539 in just five days. Highlights include a retrospective of South Korean director Bong Joon-ho's four feature films, including his recent Mother, and a special presentation and discussion of UW–Madison graduate Michael Mann's 2004 film Collateral by The New York Times co-chief film critic, Manohla Dargis.

The 2010 festival included work by Michel Gondry, Jan Hřebejk, Ken Loach, Mary Sweeney, Radu Jude, Liu Jiayin, Gianni Di Gregorio, James Marsh, Jessica Hausner, Henrik Ruben Ganz, Maren Ade, Xavier Dolan, Corneliu Porumboiu, Karen Shakhnazarov, Bradley Rust Gray, Sarah Watts, Lixin Fan, Bert I. Gordon, George Kuchar, Sergio Leone, Ladislas Starewitch, Jules Dassin, John Frankenheimer, and Elia Kazan.

External links
 Wisconsin Film Festival website

Film festivals in Wisconsin
Film festivals established in 1999
1999 establishments in Wisconsin